New X-Men is a superhero comic book series published by Marvel Comics within the X-Men franchise.

After the end of Grant Morrison's run on X-Men vol. 2 titled New X-Men, the title was used for a new series, New X-Men: Academy X during the X-Men ReLoad event. The title was later shortened to simply New X-Men in 2006 when the new creative team of Craig Kyle and Christopher Yost took over the series with issue #20.

Whereas the other X-Men comics mostly deal with established adult mutants, this series concentrates on the lives of young students residing at the Xavier Institute for Higher Learning as they learn to control their powers.

After the 2007 crossover X-Men: Messiah Complex, the New X-Men title was canceled and briefly relaunched as Young X-Men for 12 issues. The series was written by Marc Guggenheim. After the first arc of Young X-Men, the characters began appearing in the pages of Uncanny X-Men. With the cancellation of Young X-Men the characters were folded onto the main X-Men books, appearing most prominently in the pages of X-Men: Legacy, Wolverine and the X-Men, and most recently, in X-Men.

Founding

New X-Men begins where Grant Morrison's run on the former New X-Men ended. The school is rebuilt and Emma Frost and Cyclops are named the headmasters. They organize the students into several battle squads who train together.

The series focuses chiefly on two rival teams: the New Mutants, whose mentor is Danielle Moonstar, and the Hellions, whose mentor is Emma Frost.

New Mutants squad
The New Mutants squad's tutor is Danielle Moonstar. It is co-led by Wind Dancer and Prodigy.

 Elixir (Josh Foley) - Foley is an Omega-class healer who is a rabid mutant-hater until he finds out he is one himself. Following the events of "M-Day" and Reverend Stryker slaughtering many of his friends and his lover Wallflower, Elixir's powers morph so that he can now kill as well as heal with a touch of his hand.
 Icarus (Joshua "Jay" Guthrie) - Guthrie is able to fly, sing hypnotically, and heal himself rapidly. Jay's wings are amputated in issue #20 and he is killed in issue #26 by Reverend Stryker.
 Prodigy (David Alleyne) - Alleyne takes on the knowledge and skills of nearby people. After being depowered, he regained the knowledge talents originally acquired before "M-Day".
 Surge (Noriko Ashida) - A Japanese immigrant who constantly absorbs static electricity and can discharge it as electric blasts or bursts of superhuman speed. She becomes a member of the X-Men while attending the Jean Grey School for Higher Learning.
 Wallflower (Laurie Collins) - Collins exudes pheromones that alter the feelings of other people. She is killed in issue #25 by the Purifiers.
 Wind Dancer (Sofia Mantega) - A girl from Venezuela who can control air particles, allowing her to fly and hear distant conversations. Wind Dancer loses her powers as a result of "M-Day". Following her de-powering, she joined a short-lived incarnation of the New Warriors.
 Wither (Kevin Ford) - Ford is a member of the New Mutants for a short time before switching to the Hellions.

Hellions squad
The Hellions squad's tutor is Emma Frost. It is led by Hellion.

 Dust (Sooraya Qadir) - Qadir is a shy girl from Afghanistan who can turn herself into a living whirlwind of dust. She regularly dresses in an abaya with a niqāb. She joins the X-Men and is a student at the Jean Grey School for Higher Learning.
 Hellion (Julian Keller) - Keller is a mutant with the power of telekinesis. He joins the X-Men and is a student at the Jean Grey School for Higher Learning.
 Icarus (Joshua "Jay" Guthrie) - Guthrie is a member of the Hellions for a short time before switching to the New Mutants.
 Mercury (Cessily Kincaid) - Kincaid is a shapeshifter whose body is composed of non-toxic liquid mercury. She joins the X-Men and is a student at the Jean Grey School for Higher Learning.
 Rockslide (Santo Vaccaro) - Vaccaro is able to manifest a physical body made of solid rock from the immediate environment and launch limbs at great velocity. He joins the X-Men and is a student at the Jean Grey School for Higher Learning.
 Specter (Dallas Gibson) - Gibson is a member for a brief time before being reassigned to the Corsairs squad.
 Tag (Brian Cruz) - Cruz could psionically "tag" a person so that bystanders are compelled to run away from or toward that person. He is killed on the bus ambushed by the Purifiers along with several other depowered mutants.
 Wither (Kevin Ford) - Ford can destroy organic matter with a touch. He is romantic rivals with Elixir for Wallflower. When Wallflower dies, Wither flees the school and becomes Selene's second-in-command. He is killed by Elixir during the final battle of the "Necrosha" storyline.

Other squads
There are also other teams advised by different X-Men. For a complete list of students prior to "M-Day", see List of Xavier Institute students and staff.

 The Advocates squad leader is Rogue. This squad consists of:
 Boggart (Robin Wise) - Wise has super strength and green skin. He is depowered during "M-Day".
 Naiad (Aurelie Sabayon) - Sabayon has the ability to breathe underwater. She is depowered during "M-Day".
 Pinpoint (Gerard Cooper) - Cooper possesses telescopic vision. He is depowered during "M-Day".
 Trovão (Pedro de Noli) - De Noli has the ability to create sonic booms. He is depowered during "M-Day".
 Umbra (Patrick Nesbitt) - Nesbitt has the ability to manipulate darkness. He is depowered during "M-Day".
 Xenon (Shaun Kennedy) - Kennedy has the ability to generate light. He is depowered during "M-Day".
The Alpha Squadron squad leader is initially Northstar (Jean-Paul Beaubier), but he is later replaced by Xi'an "Shan" Coy Manh. The squad consists of:
 Anole (Victor Borkowski) - Borkowski has Reptilian mutations that give him enhanced strength, speed, durability, reflexes and stamina. He also has a prehensile tongue, wall crawling abilities, the ability to blend into his environment and regenerative powers. He joins the X-Men and is a student at the Jean Grey School for Higher Learning.
 Indra (Paras Gavaskar) - Gavaskar can create an exoskeleton and weapons from his skin. He is the youngest mutant at the school. He joins the X-Men and is a student at the Jean Grey School for Higher Learning.
 Kidogo (Lazaro Kotikash) - Kotikash can shrink to four inches tall. He is depowered as a result of "M-Day".
 Loa (Alani Ryan) - Ryan can disintegrate matter by phasing through it. She is enrolled at the Avengers Academy.
 Network (Sarah Vale) - Vale has the ability to communicate with machinery. She is depowered during "M-Day" and killed on the bus ambushed by the Purifiers along with several other depowered mutants.
 Rubbermaid (Andrea Margulies) - Margulies can turn her body into a rubber-like substance. She is depowered during "M-Day" and killed on the bus ambushed by the Purifiers along with several other depowered mutants.
 The Chevaliers squad leader is Gambit. This squad is introduced in X-Men vol. 2, #171. The squad consists of:
 Bling! - (Roxanne Washington) Washington's skin produces diamond shards. She joins the X-Men and is a student at the Jean Grey School for Higher Learning.
 Flubber (Nick Shelley) - Shelley's body is made of a rubbery substance. This grants him great strength and the ability to leap great distances. He is depowered during "M-Day".
 Foxx (Raven Darkholme) - Darkholme has the ability to shapeshift. She uses the alias of Foxx to infiltrate the X-Men, claiming later that she was testing Gambit's commitment to Rogue. She becomes an instructor at the Hellfire Academy and the leader of the Brotherhood of Evil Mutants.
 Onyxx (Sydney Green) - Green's body is made of a rock-like substance. He has super strength and is difficult to injure. He is killed by Wither during Selene's attack on Utopia.
 Rain Boy (Carl Aalston) - Aalston's body is living water that is held together by a containment suit.
The Corsairs squad leader is Cyclops. The squad consists of:
 Dryad (Callie Betto) - Betto can communicate with and control plant life. She is depowered during "M-Day" and killed on the bus ambushed by the Purifiers along with several other depowered mutants.
 Quill (Max Jordan) - Jordan's body is covered with quills, which he can fire as projectiles. He is shot and killed by one of Stryker's Purifiers when the mansion is attacked.
 Specter (Dallas Gibson) - Gibson can merge his body with his shadow, granting him superhuman strength, speed and durability. He can see in complete darkness and is immune to all Darkforce attacks. He is depowered as a result of "M-Day".
 Three-In-One (Celeste, Mindee and Phoebe Cuckoo) - The Cuckoo sisters are able to combine their telepathic abilities and they possess the ability to transform into an organic diamond form. They join the Extinction Team as students of the New Charles Xavier School for Mutants.
The Paladins squad leader is Kitty Pryde. The members that are named are:
 Armor (Hisako Ichiki) - Ichiki has the ability to create a psionic exoskeleton. She joins the X-Men and is a student at the Jean Grey School for Higher Learning.
 Blindfold (Ruth Aldine) - Aldine possess telepathy, the ability to see the future as well as the past, and clairvoyance. She joins the X-Men and is a student at the Jean Grey School for Higher Learning.
 Wing (Edward Tancredi) - powers neutralized by Ord; apparently committed suicide afterward in the Danger Room.
The Paragons squad leader is originally Rahne Sinclair, who is replaced by Magma (Amara Aquilla). The squad consists of:
 DJ (Mark Sheppard) - Sheppard changes music into energy blasts, blinding lights, flight or a force field. The style of music determines the ability. He is depowered during "M-Day" and killed on the bus ambushed by the Purifiers along with several other depowered mutants.
 Match (Ben Hammil) - Hammil has the ability to create and control fire. He joins the X-Men and is a student at the Jean Grey School for Higher Learning.  A mutant, Hamill attended the Xavier Institute before its closing. While at the institute, Hamill was the field leader of the Paragons training squad. Match appeared in Dark Phoenix portrayed by Lamar Johnson. The character, created by Nunzio DeFilippis and Christina Weir, first appeared in New Mutants Vol. 2 #7. DeFilippis revealed that while he and Weir created the character, he was based on a background mutant from New X-Men: Academy X, #7. "We saw a cool bit of artwork in the background of a panel (I think it was Carlo Barberi who first drew him) and thought for a few seconds about a name, codename, and power set."
 Pixie (Megan Gwynn) - Gwynn is a hybrid mutant and fairy. She can fly and her wings create a hallucinogenic dust. She also has magical powers. She joins the X-Men and is a student at the Jean Grey School for Higher Learning.
 Trance (Hope Abbott) - Abbott has the ability to create an astral projection of herself. This form is capable of flight and producing energy blasts. She joins the X-Men and is a student at the Jean Grey School for Higher Learning.
 Wolf Cub (Nicholas "Nick" Gleason) - Gleason is in a permanent lycanthropic state. He possesses enhanced strength, senses, speed, agility and endurance. He also has razor-sharp claws. He is killed by Donald Pierce.
 Preview (Jessica Vale) - Vale has the ability to see minutes into the future. She is depowered during "M-Day". She is Network's sister.

The Excelsiors, led by Iceman, are mentioned but the members are never named. The Exemplars, led by Beast, are unknown as well with the exception of Angel Salvadore. Storm's squad, mentioned in New X-Men, has one survivor, Gentle.

Decimation
In the aftermath of the Decimation event known as M-Day, the mutant student body in the academy dropped from 182 to 27. At least 45 depowered students were killed and, of the remaining students, Emma Frost picked a select group to train as New X-Men. These new X-Men were Dust, Elixir, Hellion, Mercury, Rockslide, Surge (appointed leader) and X-23. As time progressed, several members were added and/or earned the right to be on the team, such as Anole, Armor, Gentle, Pixie and Prodigy. The rest of the students were instructed to remain on school grounds, some providing assistance to the current X-Men teams and trainees. Some M-day survivors and depowered students either left the mansion or were killed off during villainous attacks by Stryker and his men, or various other enemies.

Young X-Men

The Young X-Men series launched as part of the X-Men storyline "Divided We Stand" in April, 2008. Written by Marc Guggenheim and pencilled by Yanick Paquette, it featured a line-up of Blindfold, Dust, Rockslide, Wolf Cub and three new characters: Graymalkin, Ink, and in the second issue, Cipher. The first arc involved the group being formed by Donald Pierce, who thanks to changes inflicted upon him by the Purifiers, impersonates Cyclops as part of an elaborate plot to kill the young mutants who he sees are the last generation of mutants born prior to M-Day. The group are manipulated into fighting members of the New Mutants before Pierce is ultimately exposed. In the end, per Blindfold's prediction at the start of the series, Donald Pierce murders Wolf Cub before being captured by the group and taken into custody by the X-Men.

When the X-Men franchise is relaunched with the relocation of the X-Men to San Francisco following the events in Uncanny X-Men, the characters relocate to California. The series is ultimately canceled with issue #12 and many events of the series (such as Dust being mortally wounded during the team's fight with the New Mutants) would be ignored by later writers.

X-Men: Legacy, X-Force and Wolverine and the X-Men

Most of the characters (most notably Pixie, who was granted full X-Men membership) appear sporadically following the events of Uncanny X-Men #500 and the cancellation of Young X-Men. Elixir and X-23 are incorporated into the roster of a new X-Force series. The characters are ultimately given a new home in the pages of X-Men: Legacy, written by Mike Carey starting with X-Men: Legacy #226. Now a loose collection of students, the kids are led by Rogue, who serves as the team's teacher. Following the events of X-Men: Schism, many of the New X-Men members follow Wolverine back East as he reopens the Xavier Institute as a school and sanctuary for young mutants named the Jean Grey School for Higher Learning. As of X-Men: Regenesis, several additional X-Men join Rogue and Wolverine in serving as teachers for the young mutants: Cannonball, Gambit, Rachel Grey, Husk and Shadowcat. The group has also accepted non-mutant members, such as Broo (a young Brood hatchling who is a pacifist) and Kid Gladiator, the son of X-Men enemy Gladiator. Another member of the student body is Kid Omega, whose involvement with the school is involuntary in an effort to reform him.

Contributors

Collected editions

Trade paperbacks

Hardcovers

References

External links

New X-Men at Marvel.com

Confessions of a New X-Men Reader—look back on Morrison's tenure

X-Men titles
Marvel Comics superhero teams
Works by Christopher Yost